Wang Jianan (born 31 May 1993) is a Chinese footballer who plays as for Tianjin Jinmen Tiger in the Chinese Super League.

Club career
In 2011 Wang Jianan started his professional footballer career with Henan Jianye in the Chinese Super League. He made his league debut for Henan on 2 November 2011 in a game against Shandong Luneng Taishan, coming on as a substitute for Xu Yang in the 77th minute. On 18 July 2012, he scored his first senior goal in a 2–1 away loss to Guangzhou Evergrande in the 2012 Chinese FA Cup. He was put in the transfer list at the end of 2014 season.

In July 2015, Wang transferred to fellow Chinese Super League side Guangzhou R&F. He made his debut for Guangzhou R&F on 31 October 2015 against Henan Jianye. On 15 April 2016, Wang suffered a cruciate ligament rupture after being tackled heavily by Darío Conca in a league match against Shanghai SIPG, ruling him out for the rest of the 2016 season. He returned to field on 18 June 2017 in a 1–1 home draw against Shanghai SIPG, coming on for Chen Zhizhao in the 79th minute.

Career statistics
Statistics accurate as of match played 29 August 2022.

Honours
Henan Jianye
China League One: 2013

References

External links

1993 births
Living people
Sportspeople from Luoyang
Footballers from Henan
Henan Songshan Longmen F.C. players
Guangzhou City F.C. players
Sagan Tosu players
Chinese Super League players
J1 League players
Association football midfielders
Chinese footballers
Expatriate footballers in Japan
Chinese expatriate sportspeople in Japan